The 1990–91 South Alabama Jaguars basketball team represented the University of South Alabama during the 1990–91 NCAA Division I men's basketball season. The Jaguars were led by head coach Ronnie Arrow, in the fourth year of his first stint as head coach. They played their home games at the Mitchell Center, and were members of the Sun Belt Conference. They finished the season 22–9, 11–3 in Sun Belt play to finish in first place. They won the Sun Belt tournament to earn an automatic bid to the 1991 NCAA tournament as the 13 seed in the West region. In the opening round, the Jaguars lost to Utah.

Roster

Schedule and results

|-
!colspan=9 style=| Regular season

|-
!colspan=9 style=| Sun Belt Conference tournament

|-
!colspan=9 style=| NCAA tournament

References

South Alabama Jaguars men's basketball seasons
South Alabama
South Alabama
1990 in sports in Alabama
1991 in sports in Alabama